The 2017 Argentina Women's Hockey National Tournament was the 9th edition of the women's national tournament. It was held from 24 to 27 August 2017 in Salta, Argentina.

Buenos Aires won the tournament for the fourth time after defeating Mendoza 3–1 in the final.

Squads
Players followed with a country flag are those involved in its senior national team.

Amateur Field Hockey Association of Buenos Aires

Head Coach: Fernando Ferrara

 1 - Clara Barberi 
 2 - Emilia Forcherio
 3 - Francesca Giovanelli
 4 - Luciana Galimberti
 5 - María José Fernández
 6 - Agostina Alonso 
 7 - Agustina Albertario 
 8 - Geraldine Fresco Pisani ©
 9 - Carla Dupuy
 10 - Ana López Basavilbaso
 11 - Victoria Granatto
 12 - Marisol Saenz
 13 - Magdalena Fernández Ladra 
 14 - Agustina Habif 
 15 - Mercedes Socino 
 16 - Ivana Dell'Era
 17 - Estefanía Cascallares
 18 - Ivanna Pessina 
 19 - Antonella Rinaldi
 20 - María José Granatto 

Mar del Plata's Hockey Association

Head Coach: Franco Pezzelato

 1 - Julieta Caminiti
 2 - Virginia Badra
 3 - Luz Goñi
 4 - Camila Palumbo
 5 - Manuela Marrone
 6 - Yesica Juárez
 7 - Carolina Martínez
 8 - Andrea Pedetta ©
 9 - Agustina Álvarez
 10 - Victoria Chioli
 11 - Gloria Scenna
 12 - Agustina Arista
 13 - Lucía Yohai del Cerro
 14 - Eugenia Guerrero
 15 - Soledad Ayesa
 16 - Gisela Carretero
 17 - Yanina García
 18 - Pía Goñi
 19 - Sofía Paglione
 20 - Agustina Buquicchio

Córdoba's Hockey Federation

Head Coach: Santiago Fuentes

 1 - Paula Pasquetin
 2 - Paula Bortoletto
 3 - Sofía Funes
 4 - Florencia Nogueira
 5 - Paulina Forte
 6 - Sol Rodríguez Osse
 7 - Emilia Alonso González
 8 - Victoria Miranda
 9 - Julieta Jankunas © 
 10 - Celeste Soria
 11 - Justina Paz
 12 - Agustina D'Ascola
 13 - Victoria Lorenzatti
 14 - Laura González
 15 - Carmela Briski Portela
 16 - Julieta Torres
 17 - Florencia Ametller
 18 - Emilia Inaudi
 19 - Julieta Ceballos

Mendoza's Hockey Association

Head Coach: Lucas Ghilardi di Cesare

 1 - Florencia Saravia ©
 2 - Analía Belda
 3 - Luz Rosso
 4 - Micaela Conna
 5 - Gabriela Koltes
 6 - Valentina Esley
 7 - Carolina Armani
 8 - Julieta Medici
 9 - Delfina Thome Gustavino
 10 - Bárbara Muzaber
 11 - Eugenia Mastronardi 
 12 - Mariana Scandura
 13 - Priscila Jardel 
 14 - Agustina Cabrejas Reyes
 15 - Silvina D'Elía
 16 - Sofía Vercelli
 17 - Antonella Rosato
 18 - Sofía Avedaño
 19 - Marcela Casale 
 20 - Luciana Molina

Misiones Hockey Federation

Head Coach: Mauricio Benitez

 1 - Nayibe Zampaca
 2 - Adriana Salas
 3 - Melisa Figueredo
 4 - Paola Bogado
 5 - Noelia Sanabria
 6 - Daniela Pegoraro
 7 - Paula Antueno Quintana
 8 - Paula Jara
 9 - Lumila Pigerl
 10 - Carla Curbello
 11 - Lucina von der Heyde © 
 12 - Silvina Barrios
 13 - Eugenia Filich
 14 - Agustina Alcaraz
 15 - Alexia Gularte
 16 - Rosa Batista
 17 - Sol Duarte
 18 - Constanza González
 19 - Victoria Boichuk
 20 - Magdalena Esquivel

Salta's Hockey Association

Head Coach: Joaquín Zaiontz

 1 - Rocío Veleizan
 3 - Agostina González Saavedra
 4 - Constanza Aldao Vittar
 5 - Renata Morosini
 6 - Camila Huber
 7 - Macarena Pescador
 8 - Mercedes Saavedra ©
 9 - Ivanna Aguirre
 10 - Constanza Gómez
 11 - Virginia Stieglitz
 12 - Ayelén Salazar Camilo
 13 - Gabriela Aguirre
 14 - Andrea del Frari Crespo
 15 - Rosario Villagra
 16 - Inés Ryan
 18 - Ana Medina
 19 - Camila Gómez
 20 - Jorgelina Maciel Peralta
 21 - Laura Aguirre
 22 - Ailín Martínez

San Juan's Hockey Association

Head Coach: Osvaldo Astorga

 1 - Julieta Cheruse
 2 - Cecilia López Murua
 3 - Tatiana Risueño Guarino
 5 - Agostina Donnici
 6 - Renata Morosini
 7 - Carina Guzman
 8 - Micaela Carrizo Ocampo
 9 - Julieta Luna ©
 10 - Clarisa Narvaez Guirado
 11 - Josefina Otto
 12 - Soledad Montilla Guimaraes
 13 - Pilar Narvaez Guirado
 14 - Guadalupe Ruiz
 15 - Sol Pujador
 16 - Viviana Perisotto
 17 - Lourdes Ruiz
 18 - Evelyn Barquiel
 20 - Verónica Perisotto

Tucumán's Hockey Association

Head Coach: Alberto Darnay

 1 - Paulina Carrizo
 2 - Sofía Darnay
 3 - Victoria Sauze 
 4 - Agustina Barreiro
 5 - Carla Moyano
 6 - Camila Machín ©
 7 - Julieta Rodríguez
 8 - Sofía Curia
 9 - Florencia Klimbowsky
 10 - Tania Cruz
 11 - Fernanda Martínez
 12 - Sandra Salazar
 13 - Emidia Nuñez López
 14 - Araceli Herrera
 15 - Noel Rojas
 16 - Amparo Renta Mora
 17 - Josefina Pardo
 18 - Andrea Strukov
 19 - Giuliana Calliera
 20 - Guadalupe Gallardo

Results

Pool A

Pool B

Second round

Quarterfinals

Seventh place game

Fifth place game

Medal round

Quarterfinals

Third place game

Final

Awards

Statistics

Final standings
 Buenos Aires
 Mendoza
 Tucumán
 Córdoba
 Salta
 San Juan
 Mar del Plata 
 Misiones

References

2017
Argentina
Argentina Women's
Hockey